Erwin Kalser (22 February 1883 — 26 March 1958) was a German-Jewish stage and film actor, best remembered as the Geneva Convention inspector in Stalag 17. He did most of his work in American made films.

Erwin Kalser was born Erwin Kalischer in Berlin. He was the father of Oscar-winning producer Konstantin Kalser.

Partial filmography

 George Bully (1920)
 Oberst Rokschanin (1922)
 Die Talfahrt des Severin Hoyey (1922)
 I.N.R.I. (1923) - Der Mann in der Zelle
 Rasputins Liebesabenteuer (1928) - Zar
 Anastasia, die falsche Zarentochter (1928)
 Napoleon at St. Helena (1929) - Dr. O'Meara
 The Last Company (1930) - The miller
  (1930) - Regisseur
 Dreyfus (1930) - Mathieu Dreyfus (his brother)
 A Student's Song of Heidelberg (1930) - Dr. Zinker
 Der Herzog von Reichstadt (1931) - Kanzler Fürst Metternich
 Unheimliche Geschichten (1932) - Redner in der Irrenanstalt
 Eine von uns (1932)
 The First Right of the Child (1932)
 The White Demon (1932)
 What Men Know (1933) - Herr Barthel
 Rund um eine Million (1933)
 Fusilier Wipf (1938) - Herr Godax
 Escape to Glory (1940) - Dr. Adolph Behrens
 Escape (1940) - Hotel Barkeeper (uncredited)
 The Devil Commands (1941) - Professor Kent (uncredited)
 They Dare Not Love (1941) - Klaus (uncredited)
 Underground (1941) - Dr. Franken
 Dressed to Kill (1941) - Carlo Ralph, alias Otto Kuhn
 Kings Row (1942) - Mr. Sandor
 Berlin Correspondent (1942) - Mr. Hauen
 Mission to Moscow (1943) - German Businessman (uncredited)
 Watch on the Rhine (1943) - Dr. Klauber
 The Purple Heart (1944) - Karl Schleswig (uncredited)
 Address Unknown (1944) - Stage Director
 Once Upon a Time (1944) - Scientist #3 (uncredited)
 U-Boat Prisoner (1944) - Prof. Biencawicz (uncredited)
 Strange Affair (1944) - Dr. Brenner
 They Live in Fear (1944) - Jan Dorchik
 Heavenly Days (1944) - Drummer Boy (uncredited)
 Hotel Berlin (1945) - Dr. Dorf (uncredited)
 Two Smart People (1946) - Franz (uncredited)
 After the Storm (1948) - von Tretini
 The Girl in White (1952) - Dr. Schneider
 The Congregation (1952)
 Stalag 17 (1953) - Geneva Man
 The Plot to Assassinate Hitler (1955) - Dr. med. Adler
 Stresemann (1957) - Raymond Poincaré (final film role)

References

Bibliography
 Britton, Wesley. Onscreen And Undercover: The Ultimate Book of Movie Espionage. Greenwood Publishing Group, 2006.

External links

1883 births
1958 deaths
Jewish emigrants from Nazi Germany to the United States
Jewish German male actors
German male film actors
German male silent film actors
Male actors from Berlin
20th-century German male actors
German expatriate male actors in the United States